The 2021 Minneapolis City Council election was held on November 2, 2021, to elect the members of the Minneapolis City Council. The candidate filing period was from July 27 to August 10.

Retiring members

DFL
 Alondra Cano, Ward 9
 Lisa Bender, Ward 10

Candidates

Electoral system 
The 13 members of the City Council are elected from single-member districts via instant-runoff voting, commonly known as ranked choice voting. Voters have the option of ranking up to three candidates in order of preference. Municipal elections in Minnesota are officially nonpartisan, although candidates are able to identify with a political party on the ballot. Write-in candidates must file a request with the Minneapolis Elections & Voter Services Division for votes for them to be counted.

Results

Ward 1

Ward 2

Ward 3

Ward 4

Ward 5

Ward 6

Ward 7

Ward 8

Ward 9

Ward 10

Ward 11

Ward 12

Ward 13

See also 

 2021 Minneapolis municipal election
 2021 Minneapolis Question 2

References

External links
Minneapolis Elections & Voter Services

Minneapolis City Council
Minneapolis 2021
Minneapolis 2021
Minneapolis City Council
Non-partisan elections